= Si (philosophy) =

Si (Chinese: 思; pinyin: sī) is a concept in Chinese philosophy that is usually translated as 'reflection' or 'concentration'. It refers to a species of attentive, non-rational thought that is directed at a specific subject.
